USNS John Lenthall (T-AO-189) is a  of the United States Navy. Her motto is "Shaft of the Spear."

Construction and delivery
John Lenthall, the third ship of the Henry J. Kaiser class, was laid down at Avondale Shipyard, Inc., at New Orleans, Louisiana, on 15 July 1985 and launched on 9 August 1986. After entering non-commissioned U.S. Navy service with a primarily civilian crew on 25 July 1987.

Service history

John Lenthall served in the United States Atlantic Fleet under MSC control until taken out of active service on 11 November 1996 and placed in reserve.

John Lenthall was reactivated on 7 December 1998, and is in active service in the Atlantic Fleet.

On 17 April 2004, a merchant ship lost steering control while departing Valletta, Malta, and collided with another ship before striking John Lenthall broadside while she was pierside undergoing maintenance. No one aboard John Lenthall suffered injuries, and she sustained only limited damage to outside structures and equipment.

On 23 September 2008, John Lenthall was shadowed by suspected pirates. They fled after she fired several warning shots in their vicinity.

On 9 March 2021, John Lenthall replenished  in the Western Atlantic Ocean.

Images

References

External links

 NavSource.org (Photo Archive)
 NavySite.de (Photo Archive)

Henry J. Kaiser-class oilers
Cold War auxiliary ships of the United States
Ships built in Bridge City, Louisiana
1986 ships